Somers Mansion is a historic house at Shore Road and Somers Point Circle in Somers Point, New Jersey, United States.

It was built in 1725 and added to the National Register of Historic Places in 1970.

See also

 National Register of Historic Places listings in Atlantic County, New Jersey
 List of the oldest buildings in New Jersey

References

External links
 

Houses on the National Register of Historic Places in New Jersey
Houses completed in 1725
Tourist attractions in Atlantic County, New Jersey
Houses in Atlantic County, New Jersey
National Register of Historic Places in Atlantic County, New Jersey
1725 establishments in New Jersey
New Jersey Register of Historic Places
Somers Point, New Jersey